Mahlon Houkarawa (Born April 23, 1976) is a Melanesian footballer from the Solomon Islands. Houkarawa currently plays for Koloale FC Honiara and the Solomon Islands national football team. He plays the position of defender.

Club career
Houkarawa played for the East Harbour Strikers before transferring to Koloale FC Honiara in 2002. Playing at the position of defender, Houkarawa has made relatively few appearances for the club.

International career
Houkarawa is the starting defender for the Solomon Islands national team, and has made 21 appearances for the team, and scored 1 goal. He has only been subbed out once.

References

External links

1976 births
Living people
Solomon Islands footballers
Solomon Islands international footballers
2002 OFC Nations Cup players
2004 OFC Nations Cup players
Association football defenders